Magan may refer to:

Places
Magan (civilization), also written Makan or Makkan, an ancient region referred to in Sumerian texts
Magan, Russia, a rural locality (a selo) in the Sakha Republic, Russia
Magan Airport, an airport in the Sakha Republic, Russia
Magán, Spain, a village in Spain
Magan, alternative name of Mahin, a village in Iran
Aman Magan, a village in Iran

People
Magan (name)

Film and television
Azhagiya Tamil Magan (English: Handsome Tamil Son), 2007 Tamil romantic psychological thriller film directed by Bharathan
Deiva Magan (English: Divine Son), 1969 Tamil language film by A. C. Tirulokchandar
Enakkoru Magan Pirappan, 1996 Tamil comedy film directed by K. R.
Kurathi Magan, 1972 Tamil language film by K.S. Gopala Krishnan
Saiyan Magan Pahelwani Mein, 1981 Bhojpuri film directed by Radhakant
Thanga Magan (1983 film) (English: Golden Son), 1983 Tamil film directed by A.Jagannathan
Thanga Magan (2015 film), 2015 Tamil film directed by Velraj
Thevar Magan (English Son of Thevar), 1992 Indian Tamil film directed by Bharathan

Music
Juan Magan (born 1978), Spanish producer, singer, remixer and DJ of electronic music
Magan & Rodriguez, Spanish producing / singing duo made up of Juan Magan and Marcos Rodriguez